Carlos García-Die Sánchez (born 7 July 2000) is a Spanish professional footballer who plays as a centre-back for Cádiz Mirandilla.

Professional career
García-Die is a youth product of Espanyol and Damm. He moved to Cornellà in 2019, and began his senior career on loan with Terrassa for the 2019-20 season. He returned to Cornellà for the 2020-21 season, where he broke out into the senior team. He transferred to La Liga side Cádiz on 4 July 2022, where he was originally assigned to the reserves. He made his professional debut with Cádiz as a late substitute in a 1–1 La Liga tie with Almería on 30 December 2022, and assisted his side's only goal in the 83rd minute.

References

External links
 
 
 

2000 births
Living people
Footballers from Barcelona
Spanish footballers
Association football defenders
UE Cornellà players
Terrassa FC footballers
Cádiz CF players
Cádiz CF B players
La Liga players
Primera Federación players
Tercera Federación players